Helena Sångeland (born 17 September, 1961) is a Swedish diplomat, serving as the Swedish Ambassador to China. Sångeland presented her credentials on May 16, 2019.  

She grew up in Gothenburg, where her parents had moved from Finland in the 1950s. She studied economy at Stockholm School of Economics, graduating in 1988, after which she took a job at the publishing house Bra Böcker in Höganäs but soon moved to the Swedish Ministry for Foreign Affairs. She worked at the ministry in Stockholm, but also at the embassies in Helsinki – where she served as embassy secretary between 1992 and 1995 – and Hanoi. A career diplomat, she served in the ministry for 17 years before she was appointed the Swedish Ambassador to Malaysia in 2005. She was appointed Ambassador to Iran in 2016,  until she replaced Anna Lindstedt, Swedish Ambassador to China, who was recalled to Stockholm. She's previously headed the Asia and Oceania department at the Swedish Ministry for Foreign Affairs.

Sångeland is married to architect Patrick Orhammar and has two children.

References

Living people
Ambassadors of Sweden to Iran
Ambassadors of Sweden to China
Ambassadors of Sweden to Mongolia
Swedish women ambassadors
Year of birth missing (living people)
21st-century Swedish women